EADA Business School is an international business school located in Barcelona. It was founded in 1957, and became one of the first Spanish institutions to run manager training programs for the business community. EADA Business School is one of the few business schools in Spain which has Financial Times ranking and is a member of CFA Institute partner program.  Its degrees are granted by the University of Vic - Central University of Catalonia.

Background
In its first two years, EADA was set up as a consultancy in business management and administration. It was founded by Jose de Orbaneja y Aragon. Two years later, it extended its activities to continuous specialist training in the field of business management and administration.
In 1967, it became a public limited company, the shareholders were its founders, faculty and non-faculty personnel were working for the institution.
After 1990, EADA moved to the Aragó Street building and also acquired the Collbató Residential Center. Since 1999, the school has reinforced its presence in the Latin American market and has set up various branches in different countries.

EADA is a private university foundation.

Academic units
EADA runs Full-time and part-time master's courses in different management areas, including marketing, human resources, finance, and operations.
EADA also runs high level training courses for executives: a general management program (set up in 1967) for senior managers and a management and administration program for junior and middle managers. 
EADA also runs manager development programs.

MBA Programme
EADA business school runs various MBA programs.
 LeadTech Global Executive MBA offered jointly with the Ecole du Ponts in Paris (English)
 Global executive MBA (English)
 Executive MBA (Spanish)
 MBA international (Spanish & English)
 MBA part-time (Spanish)

See also
 List of business schools in Europe
 Business School
 Master of Business Administration

References

External links
 EADA Business School (official web site)
 The Economist
 Financial Times on EADA
 Financial Times' ranking on Master of Finance
 CFA Program Partners
 Interview with Jordi (Koke) Pursals

Business schools in Spain